The Last Mission is a 1950 Greek drama film directed by Nikos Tsiforos. It was entered into the 1951 Cannes Film Festival.

Cast
 Smaroula Giouli as Maria Mareli
 Miranda Myrat as Anna Mareli
 Vasilis Diamantopoulos as Miltiadis Marelis
 Nikos Tzogias as Nikos
 Dimos Starenios as the interpreter
 Renos Koulmasis as Captain Friedrich
 Sofi Lila as Smaragdi
 Kimon Fletos as Lefteris
 Giorgos Hamaratos
 Spyros Kallimanis as the German commander
 Vagelis Protopapas (as Evangelos Protopappas) as the interrogator
 M. Takatakis
 Thanasis Tzeneralis (as Athanasios Tzeneralis) as the police captain

References

External links

1950 films
1950 drama films
Greek drama films
1950s Greek-language films
Greek black-and-white films
Films directed by Nikos Tsiforos